Aetheolabes is a genus of monopisthocotylean monogeneans in the family Diplectanidae.

Species
According to the World Register of Marine Species, the only species included in the genus is:
 Aetheolabes goeldiensis Boeger & Kritsky, 2009

References

Diplectanidae
Monogenea genera